Clive Chaman (born 5 September 1949) is a UK-based bass guitarist and session musician, born in Trinidad and Tobago.

Background
Chaman appears on recordings by UK artists including Brian Auger's Oblivion Express, Donovan, Chris Rainbow, Murray Head, Morrissey–Mullen and Paul Kossoff. Chaman was also briefly a member of Ritchie Blackmore's Rainbow replacing Bob Daisley on bass.

Career

1960s
Around the mid-1960s, he was a member of Romeo Z, a club group that was made up of Chaman on Bass, his brother Stan Chaman the group leader, Eric Allendale on trombone, and Jerry Elboz / Elbows on conga and vocals. They recorded a single "Come Back, Baby Come Back" bw "Since My Baby Said Goodbye" which was produced by Irving Martin. It was released on CBS 202645 in 1967. The group were spotted at the Chi-Chi club one night when Stanley Myers and Barry Fantoni had stopped in and were discussing the kind of switched on song they needed for a switched on intense movie. There they saw Romeo Z performing and subsequently enlisted the band to record the song "Kaleidoscope" which was used in the film, Kaleidoscope. The soundtrack was released in October 1966. A single-sided promo 45 of the track was released on KAL 1.

1970s
After appearing on Ram John Holder's 1969 London Blues album, Chaman became a member of the second Jeff Beck Group in 1971 until they disbanded in 1973 when he joined Cozy Powell's band Hammer. In 1973 he played on Now Hear This an album by Junior Marvin's band Hanson appearing alongside Bobby Tench from the second Jeff Beck Group and during this period became a member of Brian Auger's Oblivion Express. In 1974 he joined Hummingbird with keyboard player Max Middleton, vocalist and guitarist Bobby Tench and US drummer Bernard Purdie, amongst others. Hummingbird went on to record three albums for A&M Records. Following Linda Lewis' release of the Tony Sylvester and Bert de Coteaux produced "The Old Schoolyard" single, Chaman along with Max Middleton and Richard Bailey etc. were the musicians likely to back Lewis on her upcoming US club tour.

1980s -
Chaman was the bass player on the Badness album which Morrissey–Mullen released in 1981. He played on the Raven Eyes album of Japanese heavy metal guitarist, Raven Ohtani which was released in 1984.

Discography
London Blues – Ram John Holder (1969)
Jesus Christ Superstar - A Rock Opera - Tim Rice & Andrew Lloyd Webber (1971)
Rough and Ready – The Jeff Beck Group (1971)
Jeff Beck Group – The Jeff Beck Group (1972)
Cosmic Wheels – Donovan (1973)
Now Hear This – Hanson (1973)
Hummingbird – Hummingbird (1975) 
Reinforcements - Brian Auger's Oblivion Express (1975)
We Can't Go On Meeting Like This – Hummingbird (1976)
Score – Duncan Mackay (1977)
Happiness Heartaches - Brian Auger's Oblivion Express (1977) 
Diamond Nights – Hummingbird (1977)
Badness – Morrissey–Mullen (1981)

Notes

References

Jeff Beck: Crazy Fingers by Annette Carson - Backbeat Books (2001) .
Jeff's book : A chronology of Jeff Beck's career 1965-1980: from the Yardbirds to Jazz-Rock (Paperback). Chris Hjort and Doug Hinman Rock 'n' Roll Research Press.2000 .

British bass guitarists
Male bass guitarists
British session musicians
Musicians from London
Living people
1949 births
Trinidad and Tobago musicians
The Jeff Beck Group members
Hummingbird (band) members